Owosso High School (OHS) is a public high school in Owosso, Michigan. It is the sole high school in the Owosso Public Schools district.

Demographics 
The demographic breakdown for the 894 students enrolled in 2018-18 was:

 Male - 49.1%
 Female - 50.9%
 Asian - 0.9%
 Hispanic - 3.0%
 White - 93.2%
 Multiracial - 2.9%

Notable alumni 
 Jerry Hultin, United States Under Secretary of the Navy and university administrator
 Brad Van Pelt, NFL player and member of the College Football Hall of Fame

References

External links 

 Official website

Public high schools in Michigan
Schools in Shiawassee County, Michigan